NAB – Navegação Aérea Brasileira was a Brazilian airline founded in 1938. In 1961 it was sold to Lóide Aéreo Nacional.

History
NAB was founded on January 28, 1938. The founder Paulo Venâncio da Rocha Vianna initially invested heavily in technical training for both land and air staff conducted particularly by TWA. Thus in the beginning NAB followed what was most modern in terms of aviation technology and administration at its time. Its first aircraft arrived in 1941 and operated between Rio de Janeiro and Recife via Belo Horizonte, Bom Jesus da Lapa and Petrolina. In order to operate the route NAB invested in upgrading the airport facilities of Bom Jesus da Lapa and Petrolina.

Later NAB tried also to fly between Rio de Janeiro and Recife via the coast but it had no success due to the fierce competition with Serviços Aéreos Condor (later Cruzeiro do Sul) and Panair do Brasil.

Because of financial difficulties, the Brazilian government granted three successive subventions, which were used to enlarge the fleet and extend the network.

The end of World War II brought a boom in the creation of new airlines in Brazil and due to fierce competition, in order to survive, NAB was granted further two loans.

In March 1948 all services were suspended and NAB was closed on August 17, 1948. This was however not the end: the Federal Government decided to take over NAB and continue services in the states of Rio de Janeiro, Minas Gerais and Espírito Santo. Thus the airline continued its struggle for survival.

In 1957 the entrepreneur Dilvo Peres decided to invest in the airline, re-organizing its administration, buying new aircraft, and establishing an operational partnership with Panair do Brasil. The efforts were not successful and in a last attempt to survive, NAB started selling greatly discounted tickets and in-flight service was reduced to a minimum.

On October 24, 1961 Lóide Aéreo Nacional bought NAB.

Destinations
NAB served, among others, the following cities:
Belém – Val de Cães International Airport
Belo Horizonte – Pampulha Airport
Bom Jesus da Lapa – Bom Jesus da Lapa Airport
Cachoeiro de Itapemirim – Cachoeiro de Itapemirim Airport
Fortaleza – Pinto Martins International Airport
Governador Valadares – Governador Valadares Airport
João Pessoa – Presidente Castro Pinto International Airport
Montes Claros – Montes Claros Airport
Petrolina – Petrolina Airport
Recife – Guararapes International Airport
Rio de Janeiro – Santos Dumont Airport
São Luís – Tirirical Airport
Teresina – Teresina Airport
Vitória – Goiabeiras Airport

Fleet

Accidents and incidents
15 February 1945: a Lockheed 18-10 Lodestar registration PP-NAE crashed near the location of Lagoa Santa. All 11 occupants died.

See also

List of defunct airlines of Brazil

References

External links
NAB accidents as per Aviation Safety Database

Defunct airlines of Brazil
Airlines established in 1938
Airlines disestablished in 1961